The 2002–03 National Division Two was the third version (sixteenth overall) of the third division of the English domestic rugby union competition using the name National Division Two.  New teams to the division included Henley Hawks and Bracknell who were relegated from the 2001–02 National Division One while promoted teams included Doncaster who were champions of the 2001–02 National Division Three North as well as Cornish teams Penzance & Newlyn (champions) and Launceston (playoffs) who came up from the 2001–02 National Division Three South.  The league points system was 2 points for a win and 1 point for a draw.

Penzance & Newlyn finished the season as champions with Henley Hawks six points behind as runners up, both sides being convincingly the best in the division and would be promoted to the 2003–04 National Division One for the next season.  For Penzance & Newlyn it was their second successive promotion while Henley made an instant return having been relegated the following season.  Fylde and Kendal were the first two sides to be relegated but the battle for the last relegation spot was very tight with just three points separating 12th from 8th in the division.  Launceston went into their last game ahead of relegation rivals Nottingham and Wharfedale, but while those sides won their games, Launceston lost their home game against league champions and local rivals Penzance & Newlyn to condemn the Polson Bridge side to the drop – dead level with Nottingham but with a worse points difference.  Fylde and Kendal would drop to the 2003–04 National Division Three North while Launceston returned to the 2003–04 National Division Three South.

Participating teams and locations

Final league table

Results

Round 1

Round 2

Round 3

Round 4

Round 5

Round 6

Round 7

Round 8

Round 9

Round 10

Round 11

Round 12

Round 13

Round 14 

Postponed.  Game rescheduled to 28 December 2002.

Postponed.  Game rescheduled to 28 December 2002.

Round 14 (rescheduled games) 

Game rescheduled from 21 December 2002.

Game rescheduled from 21 December 2002.

Round 15 

Postponed.  Game rescheduled to 15 February 2003.

Round 16 

Postponed.  Game rescheduled to 15 February 2003.

Postponed.  Game rescheduled to 8 March 2003.

Postponed.  Game rescheduled to 8 March 2003.

Postponed.  Game rescheduled to 22 March 2003.

Postponed.  Game rescheduled to 15 February 2003.

Round 17

Round 18

Round 19 

Postponed.  Game rescheduled to 8 March 2003.

Postponed.  Game rescheduled to 8 March 2003.

Round 20

Rounds 15 & 16 (rescheduled games) 

Game rescheduled from 4 January 2003.

Game rescheduled from 11 January 2003.

Game rescheduled from 15 January 2003.

Round 21

Round 22

Rounds 16 & 19 (rescheduled games) 

Game rescheduled from 1 February 2003.

Game rescheduled from 11 January 2003.

Game rescheduled from 11 January 2003.

Game rescheduled from 1 February 2003.

Round 23

Round 16 (rescheduled game)

Game rescheduled from 11 January 2003.

Round 24

Round 25

Round 26

Total season attendances

Individual statistics 

 Note that points scorers includes tries as well as conversions, penalties and drop goals.

Top points scorers

Top try scorers

Season records

Team
Largest home win — 50 pts
74 - 24 Henley Hawks at home to Stourbridge on 12 April 2003
Largest away win — 42 pts
54 - 12 Penzance & Newlyn away to Kendal on 7 December 2002
Most points scored — 74 pts
74 - 24 Henley Hawks at home to Stourbridge on 12 April 2003
Most tries in a match — 10
Henley Hawks at home to Stourbridge on 12 April 2003
Most conversions in a match — 9
Henley Hawks at home to Stourbridge on 12 April 2003
Most penalties in a match — 7 (x2)
Sedgley Park away to Wharfedale on 31 August 2002
Stourbridge at home to Kendal on 16 November 2003
Most drop goals in a match — 2 (x3)
Esher at home to Kendal on 28 September 2002
Kendal at home to Henley Hawks on 2 November 2002
Kendal at home to Newbury Blues on 8 February 2003

Player
Most points in a match — 28 (x2)
 Chris Glynn for Sedgley Park away to Wharfedale on 31 August 2002
 Jonathon Davies for Wharfedale at home to Kendal on 12 April 2003
Most tries in a match — 4 (x2)
 Victor Olonga for Penzance & Newlyn away to Kendal on 7 December 2002
 Nash Shumba for Esher away to Stourbridge on 8 February 2003
Most conversions in a match — 9
 Barry Reeves for Henley Hawks at home to Stourbridge on 12 April 2003
Most penalties in a match —  7 (x2)
 Chris Glynn for Sedgley Park away to Wharfedale on 31 August 2002
 Ben Harvey for Stourbridge at home to Kendal on 16 November 2003
Most drop goals in a match —  2 (x3)
 Chris Finch for Esher at home to Kendal on 28 September 2002
 Mike Scott for Kendal at home to Henley Hawks on 2 November 2002
 Mike Scott for Kendal at home to Newbury Blues on 8 February 2003

Attendances
Highest — 2,200
Penzance & Newlyn at home to Henley Hawks on 18 January 2003
Lowest — 120 (x2)
Bracknell against Nottingham 8 March 2003 and Sedgley Park on 15 March 2003
Highest Average Attendance — 1,614
Penzance & Newlyn
Lowest Average Attendance — 231	
Bracknell

See also
 English Rugby Union Leagues
 English rugby union system
 Rugby union in England

References

External links
 NCA Rugby

National
National League 1 seasons